Phelsuma astriata astriata is a subspecies of Seychelles small day gecko. It is a small, slender lizard with bright green colour that feeds primarily on insects. It is found on several islands of the Seychelles.

Description 
Its body is lime green with coloured dots and bars on the back. Those reddish dots sometimes form a mid-dorsal stripe, which can be very faint. Males often have a bluish or turquoise-coloured tail and lower back. On both sides of the snout, a reddish-brown stripe extends from the nostrils to the eyes. The undersurface of the body is off-white. These lizards reach a total length of about 14 cm.

Distribution 
This gecko is found on the Seychelles islands of Astove, Mahé, Praslin, Curieuse, La Digue, and Frégate.

Habitat 
This species is typically found on coconut palms and banana trees. It often lives near human settlements.

Reproduction 
Phelsuma astriata astriata normally lays two 10 mm eggs. Seychelles small day geckos are not gluers; they do not stick their eggs to the sides/underside of items, but instead place them in safe, well-hidden areas.  Incubation is generally 65 – 70 days at 82 degrees Fahrenheit.

Bibliography 
Henkel, F. W. and Schmidt, W. (1995) Amphibien und Reptilien Madagaskars, der Maskarenen, Seychellen und Komoren. Ulmer Stuttgart. 
McKeown, Sean (1993) Day Geckos (General Care, Maintenance and Breeding Series). Advanced Vivarium Systems, Lakeside CA.

References

Fauna of Seychelles
Phelsuma